In graph theory, a -interval hypergraph is a kind of a hypergraph constructed using intervals of real lines. The parameter  is a positive integer. The vertices of a -interval hypergraph are the points of  disjoint lines (thus there are uncountably many vertices). The edges of the graph are -tuples of intervals, one interval in every real line.

The vertex set of a 1-interval hypergraph is the set of real numbers; each edge in such a hypergraph is an interval of the real line. For example, the set  defines a 1-interval hypergraph. Note the difference from an interval graph: in an interval graph, the vertices are the intervals (a finite set); in a 1-interval hypergraph, the vertices are all points in the real line (an uncountable set). 

As another example, in a 2-interval hypergraph, the vertex set is the disjoint union of two real lines, and each edge is a union of two intervals: one in line #1 and one in line #2. 

The following two concepts are defined for -interval hypergraphs just like for finite hypergraphs:

 A matching is a set of non-intersecting edges, i.e., a set of non-intersecting -intervals. For example, in the 1-interval hypergraph  the set  is a matching of size 2, but the set  is not a matching since its elements intersect.
 A covering or a transversal is a set of vertices that intersects every edge, i.e., a set of points that intersects every -interval. For example, in the 1-interval hypergraph  the set  is a covering of size 2, but the set  is not a covering since it does not intersect the edge .

 is true for any hypergraph . 

Tibor Gallai proved that, in a 1-interval hypergraph, they are equal: . This is analogous to Kőnig's theorem for bipartite graphs.

Gabor Tardos proved that, in a 2-interval hypergraph, and it is tight (i.e., every 2-interval hypergraph with a matching of size , can be covered by  points).

Kaiser proved that, in a -interval hypergraph, and moreover, every -interval hypergraph with a matching of size , can be covered by at  points,  points on each line.

Frick and Zerbib proved a colorful ("rainbow") version of this theorem.

References 

Hypergraphs